Nikoloz (Koka) Ignatov (Georgian: ნიკოლოზ (კოკა) იგნატოვი) (July 29, 1937 – May 6, 2002) was a 20th-century Georgian painter. He studied at the Tbilisi State Academy of Arts.

External links 
 Georgian Art Portal

1937 births
2002 deaths
Painters from Georgia (country)
Tbilisi State Academy of Arts alumni
Artists from Tbilisi